ArchitectureWeek is an international weekly magazine covering architecture and design, published online by Artifice, Inc. in Eugene, Oregon, United States. ArchitectureWeek was founded in May 2000, with its first issue publication on May 17, 2000.

Overview 
The magazine is aimed at professional architects, other design professionals and enthusiasts. It includes dedicated sections about news, design, building technology, design tools, the environment and building culture. ArchitectureWeek features designs by international architects with high-resolution photos available to subscribers.

The current Editor-in-Chief is Kevin Matthews, MArch. More than 100 authors have contributed to the over 540 issues published to date.

ArchitectureWeek is interlinked with Archiplanet, a subject-specific wiki for all buildings and building makers.

The editors of ArchitectureWeek selected architecture from around the world and across history. Which now comprise the Great Buildings collection. Pages include photographic images and architectural drawings, integrated maps and timelines, 3D building models, commentaries, bibliographies, and web links, with Google Maps throughout.

References

External links
 ArchitectureWeek
 Great Buildings collection

2000 establishments in Oregon
Architecture magazines
Magazines published in Oregon
Mass media in Eugene, Oregon
Online magazines published in the United States
Weekly magazines published in the United States